Paramatta is a locality in the Australian state of South Australia located on the Yorke Peninsula on the north-east side of the urban area associated with Moonta about  north-west of the Adelaide city centre. It was named using the same Aboriginal phrase for the suburb of Sydney spelled Parramatta.

Description
Paramatta is located within the federal division of Grey, the state electoral district of Narungga and the local government area of the Copper Coast Council. Its boundaries were created in January 1999 for “the long established local name.”  The name was derived from the Paramatta Mine.  In 2014, land was added to the locality from Warburto to “better align postal delivery and to reflect historical associations.” As of 2014, land within the locality was zoned for agriculture.

References

Towns in South Australia
Yorke Peninsula